The Paar is a river of Bavaria, Germany, a right tributary of the Danube. For several tens of kilometers it flows parallel to the Lech, at only a few km distance. Near Augsburg, the Paar leaves the Lech valley and turns north-east towards Ingolstadt. It flows into the Danube near Vohburg. Towns and municipalities along the Paar include Egling, Mering, Aichach, Schrobenhausen and Manching.

See also
List of rivers of Bavaria

References

Rivers of Bavaria
Tributaries of the Danube
Rivers of Germany